is a Japanese manga series written and illustrated by Sōichirō Yamamoto. It has been serialized in Shogakukan's shōnen manga magazine Monthly Shōnen Sunday since January 2018. An anime television series adaptation by CloverWorks aired from April to July 2022.

Plot
Tsubaki, a kunoichi and the best student of the Akane Class, lives in a village where women are not allowed to have contact with men. However, she has a curiosity about them that she wants to keep hidden.

Characters

Akane Class

Team Dog

A newcomer to the village. She initially presented herself as a boy. She is usually seen wearing a mask.

Team Sheep

Team Horse

Team Monkey

Team Rat

Team Ox

Team Tiger

Team Snake

Team Dragon

Team Rabbit

Team Rooster

Team Boar

Teachers

Media

Manga
Written and illustrated by Sōichirō Yamamoto, In the Heart of Kunoichi Tsubaki began serialization in Shogakukan's shōnen manga magazine Monthly Shōnen Sunday on January 12, 2018. The series is set to end in May 2023. Shogakukan has collected its chapters into individual tankōbon volumes. The first volume was released on July 12, 2018. As of March 10, 2023, eight volumes have been released.

Volume list

Anime
On November 9, 2021, Aniplex announced an anime television series adaptation produced by CloverWorks. The series was directed by Takuhiro Kodachi, with the scripts handled by Konomi Shugo, character designs by Yousuke Okuda, and music composition by Yūsuke Shirato. It aired from April 10 to July 3, 2022, on Tokyo MX and other networks. For each episode, different cast members performed a version of the ending theme song  as their respective teams. Crunchyroll has licensed the series. Medialink has licensed the series in South and Southeast Asia.

Episode list

Reception
In 2020, the manga was one of the 50 nominees for the 6th Next Manga Awards. The anime adaptation was also one of the 100 nominees for the Anime Fan Award during the 2023 Tokyo Anime Award  Festival, placing 4th behind Tiger & Bunny 2, Uta no Prince-sama: Maji Love 1000%, and Mechamato.

Anime News Network reviewers Caitlin Moore, Richard Eisenbeis, Nicholas Dupree, James Beckett, and Rebecca Silverman greatly criticized the premise, calling it "contrived, uncreative, and unfunny". While some praise was given to its art style, the series was also criticized for its "questionable artistic decisions", referring to the character designs and outfit choices.

Notes

References

External links
 
 

2022 anime television series debuts
Anime series based on manga
Aniplex
CloverWorks
Comedy anime and manga
Crunchyroll anime
Medialink
Ninja in anime and manga
Shogakukan manga
Shōnen manga
Tokyo MX original programming